Oihane is a female Basque given name. Notable people with the name include:

Oihane Hernández (born 2000), Spanish footballer
Oihane Otaegi (born 1977), Spanish curler 
Oihane Valdezate (born 2000), Spanish footballer

Basque feminine given names